Île Pariseau is a small island located in the Rivière des Prairies across the river from Île Bizard and Montreal Island.

The island is part of Îles Laval which is linked to Île Jésus (Sainte Dorothée, Laval), Quebec, Canada. Îles Laval became part of Laval in 1965.

External links
Some info on the Island

 

Pariseau
Landforms of Laval, Quebec
Pariseau